The Shadow Mk.II, is a purpose-built sports prototype race car, designed, developed and built by Shadow Racing Cars to Group 7 racing specifications, specifically to compete in the Can-Am racing series, in 1971.

References

Sports prototypes
Can-Am cars
Mk.II